Judge Wells may refer to:

Brooke C. Wells (fl. 1970s–2020s), magistrate judge of the United States District Court for the District of Utah
Ira K. Wells (1871–1934), judge of the United States District Court for the District of Puerto Rico
Lesley B. Wells (born 1937), judge of the United States District Court for the Northern District of Ohio
Robert William Wells (1795–1864), judge of the United States District Court for the District of Missouri and the Western District of Missouri
Thomas B. Wells (born 1945), judge of the United States Tax Court

See also
Justice Wells (disambiguation)